FK Dolina Padina is a football club based in Padina, Vojvodina, Serbia. They compete in the PFL Pančevo, the fifth tier of the national league system.

History
The club was founded as SŠK Jánošík in 1938. They were forced to stop their activities by the occupators during World War II. The club was later restored and named FK Tatra. In 1958, they eventually changed name to FK Dolina.

The club won the Vojvodina League East in the 2008–09 season and took promotion to the Serbian League Vojvodina. They spent the following four years in the third tier of Serbian football, before placing first and gaining promotion to the Serbian First League in 2013. However, the club suffered relegation back to the Serbian League Vojvodina after just one season.

Honours
Serbian League Vojvodina (Tier 3)
 2012–13
Vojvodina League East (Tier 4)
 2008–09

Seasons

Notable players
For a list of all FK Dolina Padina players with a Wikipedia article, see :Category:FK Dolina Padina players.

Managerial history

References

External links
 Club page at Srbijasport

1938 establishments in Serbia
Association football clubs established in 1938
Football clubs in Serbia
Football clubs in Vojvodina